Acronymble is a board game published in 1991. It challenges players to create funny acronyms (known as noodles) from a random sequence of letters.

Gameplay
For example, if players received the letters E.U.M.G., one might write, "Elvis Unglued My Grandfather", and another, "Eek!!! Ugly Man-eating Gerbils!" Players then vote for their favorite acronym using a blind voting process, and are not allowed to vote for their own noodles.

The game gives players three to seven letters each round to write their "Noodles". Letters are given in one of three ways:

 Purely random (e.g. E.U.M.G.)
 All the Same Letter (e.g. S.S.S.S.S.)
 A starting letter and a length are given (e.g. “G” and a “6”). Players are then challenged to come up with a 6 letter word that starts with “G” (e.g. “GIGGLE”) and use those letters to write their Noodle. (e.g. Granny Is Glowing, Growing Little Eggplants.”)

Acronymble is mostly subjective, in that there are no right and wrong answers, although players are awarded points if their Noodle contains a complete sentence.

History
Acronymble was developed by Acronymwits Inc. in 1991, and designed by Steven May. An Acronymble game show spoof was later produced using the premise. It aired on public access television in Massachusetts and won the Massachusetts Cable Commission award for "Best Entertainment and Variety Show" in 1997. May also writes fiction under the pseudonym "Commander Pants".

There are online versions of Acronymble played under a number of different names, Acrophobia being the most popular (Acronymble predates all of these). The only differences between Acronymble and these online versions is that they offer players only random letters to work with, and they often ask competitors to write their acronyms on a specific subject.

References

External links
 The official Acronymble website
 Acronymble entry on BoardGameGeek
 Acronymble wins the DeepFun Party Game Award
 Family Review Center Award

Board games introduced in 1991
Word board games